An election for Members of the European Parliament representing Netherlands constituency for the 1984–1989 term of the European Parliament was held on 14 June 1984. It was part of the wider 1984 European election. Nine parties competed in a D'Hondt type election for 25 seats.

Background

Combined lists
Several parties combined in one list to take part in this European Election and increase their chance on a seat in the European Parliament. These combined lists are:
 Green Progressive Accord of CPN, PSP, PPR and Green Party of the Netherlands
 SGP, RPF and GPV

Electoral alliances
Two lists formed an electoral alliance: 
 PvdA/European Social-Democrats and Green Progressive Accord

Voting right
These people got right to vote in this second election for the European Parliament in 1984 in the Netherlands:
 Everyone who was allowed to vote in the Dutch parliament elections;
 Dutch who are resident in other Member States and did not already have voting rights for the Dutch Parliament elections;
 Subjects of one of the other Member States which have residence in the Netherlands. Provided that the state of which they are from granted the same.

Numbering of the candidates list

Results

In these elections both the leftwing CPN, PSP, PPR and Green Party of the Netherlands parties and the orthodox Protestant SGP, GPV, RPF parties have formed a successful common lists, which win two respectively one seat. the progressive liberal D'66 loses its two seats and disappears from the parliament. 50.88% of the Dutch population turned out on election day.

European groups 

| style="text-align:center;" colspan="11" | 
|-
|style="background-color:#E9E9E9;text-align:center;vertical-align:top;" colspan="3"|European group
!style="background-color:#E9E9E9" |Seats 1979
!style="background-color:#E9E9E9" |Seats 1984
!style="background-color:#E9E9E9" |Change
|-
| 
| style="text-align:left;" | Confederation of Socialist Parties
| style="text-align:left;" | SOC
| style="text-align:right;" | 9
| style="text-align:right;" | 9
| style="text-align:right;" | 0 
|-
| 
| style="text-align:left;" | European People's Party
| style="text-align:left;" | EPP
| style="text-align:right;" | 10
| style="text-align:right;" | 8
| style="text-align:right;" | 2 
|-
| style="background-color:gold;" width=0.3em|
| style="text-align:left;" | European Liberal Democrats
| style="text-align:left;" | LD
| style="text-align:right;" | 4
| style="text-align:right;" | 5
| style="text-align:right;" | 1 
|-
| 
| style="text-align:left;" | Rainbow Group
| style="text-align:left;" | RBW
| style="text-align:right;" | 0
| style="text-align:right;" | 2
| style="text-align:right;" | 2 
|-
| 
| style="text-align:left;" | Non-Inscrits
| style="text-align:left;" | NI
| style="text-align:right;" | 2
| style="text-align:right;" | 1
| style="text-align:right;" | 1 
|-
|width="350" style="text-align:right;background-color:#E9E9E9" colspan="3"|
|width="30" style="text-align:right;background-color:#E9E9E9"| 25
|width="30" style="text-align:right;background-color:#E9E9E9"| 25
|width="30" style="text-align:right;background-color:#E9E9E9"| 0 
|}

Elected members

Labour Party
Hedy d'Ancona
Bob Cohen
Piet Dankert (top candidate)
Ien van den Heuvel-de Blank
Alman Metten
Hemmo Muntingh
Ben Visser
Phili Viehoff
Eisso Woltjer

Christian Democratic Appeal
Bouke Beumer (top candidate)
Elise Boot
Yvonne van Rooy
Pam Cornelissen
Hanja Maij-Weggen
Jean Penders
Teun Tolman
Wim Vergeer

People's Party for Freedom and Democracy
Hans Nord (top candidate)
Jessica Larive
Hendrik Jan Louwes
Gijs de Vries
Florus Wijsenbeek

Green Progressive Accord: CPN, PSP, PPR and Green Party of the Netherlands
Bram van der Lek (PSP) (top candidate)
Herman Verbeek (PPR)

SGP, RPF and GPV
Leen van der Waal (SGP) (top candidate)

MEPs period 1984–1989
Below is a complete list of members of the European Parliament for the period 1984–1989 as a result of this election.

References 

Netherlands
1984
1984 in the Netherlands